The name Khwarazmian (also Khwarezmian, Khwarizmim, Khorezmian, Chorasmian, Carizmian, and others) may refer to:

Places and peoples
 Khwarazm, a large oasis region on the Amu Darya river delta in western Central Asia
Khwarazmshah, the title of various rulers of Khwarazm from four different dynasties
Khwarazmian Empire, a Turko-Persian Sunni Muslim empire that ruled large parts of present-day Central Asia, Afghanistan, and Iran from about 1077 to 1231
Khwarazmian dynasty, its ruling dynasty of Khwarazmshahs
Khwarazmian army between 1231 and 1246, which sacked Jerusalem in 1244

Languages and scripts
 Khwarezmian language (6th–13th century), an extinct East Iranian language
 Chorasmian (script), script used in writing the (Iranian) Khwarazmian language
 Chorasmian (Unicode block), the Unicode block containing the script
 Khorezmian language (Turkic) (13th–14th century), an extinct Turkic language

See also
 Al-Khwārizmī (disambiguation)
 Khorasan (disambiguation)

Language and nationality disambiguation pages